Cleveland Hopkins International Airport  is an international airport in Cleveland, Ohio, United States. It is the primary airport serving Greater Cleveland and Northeast Ohio, the largest and busiest airport in the state, and the 43rd busiest airport in the U.S. by passenger numbers.

The airport has been at the forefront of several innovations that are now commonplace. It was the first airport with an air traffic control tower and a two-terminal design separating arrivals from departures. It was also the first airport to be directly connected with a mass transit system.

Cleveland was a hub for United Airlines from the post–World War II era until the mid-1980s. After United moved its hub operations to Washington–Dulles, Continental Airlines opened a hub which made it the dominant carrier at the airport in the 1990s and 2000s. After United and Continental merged under the United brand in 2010, United closed the Cleveland hub, though it still has a flight attendant base, pilot base, and maintenance facilities at the airport and is its largest carrier by passenger count. United's hub closure created an opening for new airlines like Frontier Airlines and Spirit Airlines to enter the market. Within a few years after United closed the hub, passenger traffic rebounded to where it was before the closure.

Cleveland Hopkins offers non-stop passenger service to nearly 40 destinations. Cleveland Hopkins is operated by the Cleveland Department of Port Control, which also includes Burke Lakefront Airport located downtown. In 2018, Airports Council International ranked Cleveland Hopkins the most improved North American airport in the 2017 Airport Service Quality Survey.

History

Cleveland Hopkins is of particular importance to the history of commercial air travel due to a number of first-in-the-world innovations that would eventually become the global standard. Founded in 1925, it was one of the first municipality-owned facility of its kind in the United States. It was the site of the first air traffic control tower, the first ground-to-air radio control system, and the first airfield lighting system, all in 1930; and it was the first U.S. airport to be directly connected to a local or regional rail transit system, in 1968.  

It was also the first airport to employ a two-level terminal design separating arrivals from departures. The airport was named after its founder, former city manager William R. Hopkins, on his 82nd birthday in 1951.

First closure of United hub and establishment of Continental hub
United Airlines established its easternmost domestic hub in Cleveland after World War II, which it maintained until the mid-1980s, when it closed its Cleveland hub and moved capacity to a new hub at Washington–Dulles. Following the closure of the United hub, Continental Airlines (which at the time was a separate carrier and lacked a Midwest hub) responded by adding capacity to Cleveland, as did USAir, which was the dominant carrier at the airport from 1987 until the early 1990s.  While USAir soon reduced its schedule from Cleveland, Continental substantially increased its hub capacity, becoming the airport's largest tenant and eventually accounting for upwards of 60 percent of passenger traffic. Continental and the airport both made substantial operational and capital investments in the airport's infrastructure.  In 1992, the airport completed a $50 million renovation of Concourse C, which housed all of Continental's flights.  The renovation included the installation of a continuous skylight, a Continental President's Club lounge, and a new Baggage Claim area.  In 1999, the airport completed an $80 million expansion that included the construction of the new Concourse D (now closed), which was built to accommodate Continental Express and Continental Connection flights.

Continental Airlines launched daily seasonal flights to London's Gatwick Airport in June 1999, Cleveland's first transatlantic service since cancellation of Jat Airways' once-weekly route from Cleveland to Ljubljana, Slovenia was cancelled in the 1980s. The airline also flew to Paris in summer 2008 but terminated the route due to economic concerns. 

The following year, Continental stated that its London route, which by then had switched to Heathrow Airport, would not return in 2010. The carrier pointed to the recession and an inability to obtain affordable seasonal slots at Heathrow as reasons behind its decision. At the same time, an article in The Plain Dealer suggested additional factors were at play, such as the notion that rising collaboration between Continental and United Airlines meant passengers could transit through United's hub at Chicago-O'Hare instead. The cancellation of the route left Cleveland without a direct link to Europe for the next several years.

Continental–United merger and second closure of United hub
In 2010, Continental and United Airlines announced that they would merge operations. The merger prompted concerns that a post-merger United would reduce or close its hub in Cleveland and instead route passengers through the new United's Chicago-O'Hare and Washington-Dulles hubs. On November 10, 2010, Continental CEO Jeff Smisek stated in a speech in Cleveland that "Cleveland needs to earn its hub status every day" and added that overall profitability would be the determining factor in whether the new United kept or closed the Cleveland hub.

United continued to reduce its capacity in Cleveland following the merger, which already had been substantially reduced in the wake of the 2008 financial crisis.  On February 1, 2014, United announced that the airline would shut down its Cleveland hub, stating as justification that the airline's hub at Cleveland "hasn't been profitable for over a decade." By June 5, 2014, United had effectively terminated its hub operation at the airport, reducing its daily departures by more than 60%. United also closed Concourse D and consolidated all of its remaining operations in Concourse C, although it is required to continue to pay the airport $1,112,482 a month in rent for the facility until 2027.

Post-hub history
The airport initially experienced a sharp decline in passenger counts following the closure of United's hub in 2014.  Several other airlines, however, increased their service to Cleveland in subsequent years. Frontier Airlines significantly increased its service to the airport and declared Cleveland a focus city. 

Other low-cost airlines such as Spirit Airlines and Allegiant Air began new service to the airport as well, and existing airlines such as American Airlines, Delta Air Lines, and Southwest Airlines also increased their number of daily flights and destinations. As a result, by 2017, the airport's passenger count exceeded levels achieved during the last full year that United maintained a hub in Cleveland.

Despite the closure of its hub, as of 2017 United still maintained roughly 1,200 employees in Greater Cleveland, including a flight attendant and pilot base as well as maintenance facilities. United also remains the largest carrier at Hopkins. Regional airline CommutAir, which flies exclusively on behalf of United Express, is headquartered in nearby North Olmsted.

Icelandair and WOW air reconnected Cleveland with Europe in May 2018, inaugurating flights to Reykjavík. Nevertheless, both airlines had left Northeast Ohio by 2019. WOW air had been suffering financially, while Icelandair faced the grounding of the aircraft it operated to Cleveland and potentially the low profitability of the service.

Facilities

Terminal
Cleveland Hopkins consists of one two-level passenger terminal, which was completed in 1978, and renovated in 2016. There are four concourses, three of which are currently in use.
Concourse A houses Frontier, Spirit, charters, and all international arrivals.  Delta Air Lines also uses it for overflow parking and sports charters. It also houses the airport's Federal Inspection Services (FIS) customs and border protection facility.  Originally known as "North Concourse", it was opened in 1957 and rebuilt in 1978–79. Allegiant Air used this Concourse until January 2022 when it terminated all flights to Cleveland.
Concourse B houses Delta and Southwest.  Originally the “West Concourse”, it was built in 1954 as the first extension pier to the airport, and was rebuilt and expanded from 1982 to 1983. 
Concourse C houses Air Canada Express, Alaska, American, JetBlue and all United services, except for international arrivals which are handled in Concourse A. Originally known as "South Concourse", it opened in 1969 and was renovated in 1992.
Concourse D has been vacant since 2014, when United closed its gates and consolidated all operations to Concourse C. Built in 1999, it is a separate terminal connected to Concourse C by an underground walkway. Although capable of handling larger jets such as the Boeing 737, it exclusively handled smaller regional aircraft during its operation. Concourse D contains 12 jet bridge gates and 24 ramp loading positions.

Gates A2, A6, and occasionally A7 are used by Spirit.
Gates A1, A8, A10, & A12 are used by Frontier.
Gates A14, occasionally A12 as well, are used for international arrivals.
Gate A4 is not used and not in operable condition.
Gate A3 and A5 are not currently used.

Gates B2, B3, B4, B5, & B6 are used by Delta.
Gates B7, B8, B9, B10, & B11 are used by Southwest.
Gate B1 is a stairwell and is not in use.

Gates C2, C3, C5, C7, C8, C9, C10, C11, & C14 are used by American. American's primary gates are C3, C5, C7, C9, & C11. However, for overflow and from time to time they will use C8, C10, & C14.
Gate C6 is used by JetBlue.
Gates C17, C18, C19, C21, C22, C23, C24, C25, C26, C27, & C29 are used by United.
Gate C20 is used by Air Canada.
Gates C16 & C28 aren't in use.
Gate C4 is being used by Alaska Airlines as of June 2022.

Runways
 06R/24L:  concrete
 06L/24R:  concrete
 10/28:  asphalt/concrete

Other facilities
Cleveland Hopkins is home to both crew and maintenance bases for United Airlines.

The airport is also home to one of five kitchens operated by airline catering company Chelsea Food Services, a subsidiary of United Airlines.

Cleveland Airmall, a unit of Fraport USA, manages the retail and dining locations at the airport.  Tenants include Johnston & Murphy, Great Lakes Brewing Company, Rock & Roll Hall of Fame Museum Store, Bar Symon, and Sunglass Hut.

A Sheraton Hotel also occupies the airport grounds immediately east of the terminal. Built in 1959, it has 243 rooms and was a popular layover point for passengers and crews during the airport’s hub days with United and Continental. The hotel closed in June 2022 after its ownership group defaulted on its loans. The airport subsequently acquired the building and intends to demolish it in order to add more parking spaces.

The airport has two lounges: a United Club in Concourse C and The Club CLE near the entrance to Concourse B in the Main Terminal.

Ground transportation
The airport is connected to the Cleveland Rapid Transit system with the Red Line Rapid Transit station beneath the terminal.
The airport has a dedicated taxi service of 110 vehicles.

Rental car operations are located at a consolidated rental car facility off the airport property. Shuttle services are provided between the airport and the facility.

Airlines and destinations

Passenger

Cargo

Statistics

Airline market share

* - Includes flights operated by American Eagle, Delta Connection and United Express partner airlines. Those numbers are not a part of mainline operation numbers.

Top destinations

Annual passenger traffic

Accidents and incidents
 On May 24, 1938, United Air Lines Flight 9, a Douglas DC-3 flying from Newark to Chicago via Cleveland crashed on approach to Cleveland killing all seven passengers and three crew members on board.
 On August 27, 1971, a Chicago & Southern Airlines Volpar Turboliner with 2 occupants on board suffered a loss of power on the no.1 engine shortly after takeoff, it stalled and crashed killing 1 crew member of the 2 on board.
 On December 18, 1978, an Allegheny Commuter DeHavilland Heron (operated by Fischer Brothers Aviation) was landing at Cleveland from Mansfield Lahm Airport when a ground controller cleared a snow plow to cross the runway at the same time the aircraft was landing, resulting in a collision. The flight had a crew of 2 pilots and 15 passengers. There were no fatalities nor serious injuries. The aircraft was damaged beyond repair. 
 On January 4, 1985, an armed 42-year-old Cleveland woman named Oranette Mays hijacked Pan Am flight 558, a Boeing 727 scheduled to fly from Cleveland to New York City's John F. Kennedy International Airport. During the boarding process for the flight in Cleveland, Mays shot her way onto the plane, shooting and injuring a USAir employee who tried to stop her in the process. Mays then commandeered the plane, took 7 hostages (including an 8-month-old baby), and demanded to be taken to Rio de Janeiro, Brazil. After a 6-hour stand-off, a SWAT team made up of Cleveland police and FBI agents stormed the plane.  Mays and an officer were shot before police were able to arrest Mays.
 On February 17, 1991, Ryan International Airlines Flight 590, a McDonnell Douglas DC-9-15 cargo flight bound for Indianapolis International Airport stalled and crashed after takeoff from CLE due to wing contamination. While the DC-9 was on the ground for 35 minutes, there was no de-icing service on the aircraft and blowing snow accumulated on the wings, causing a stall and loss of control on takeoff. Both occupants were killed.
 On December 15, 1992, a Mohican Air Service Volpar Turboliner II on a ferry flight crashed after its initial climb, the sole occupant was killed. Improper installation of the elevator during recent maintenance on the aircraft was the probable cause.
 On January 6, 2003, a Continental Express Embraer ERJ-145LR overran the runway upon landing from Bradley International Airport in Windsor Locks, CT. The airplane continued beyond the departure end, on the extended runway centerline, and struck the ILS runway 6 localizer antenna. It came to rest with the nose about  beyond the end of the runway. The nose landing gear had collapsed rearward and deformed the forward pressure bulkhead.
 On February 18, 2007, Delta Connection Flight 6448, operated by Shuttle America, landed at CLE in snowy weather & gusty winds. The flight arrived from Atlanta, Ga. and was an Embraer E-170 with 4 crew members and 71 passengers. Despite the use of full reverse and braking, the aircraft didn't slow down, left the runway and partially went through a fence 150 feet from the end of the runway. Of the 75 on board, there were no fatalities. Even though the aircraft was substantially damaged, it was repaired and put back into service.

Controversies

Ground Transportation Center
In May 2015, the airport moved the pick-up and drop off location for most shuttles to the former limo lot, requiring most passengers to take two escalators underneath the former shuttle parking in the arrivals lane at the airport. Originally meant to be a temporary fix, the airport made the Ground Transportation Center a permanent fixture in May 2017. This angered many travelers, who complained on various social media platforms, as well as local media outlets, garnering negative publicity for the airport's plans. In March 2019, the pick ups and drop offs location for most of the shuttles (except for limo shuttles) have moved to the north end of the baggage claim level.

Parking
In May 2013, the airport demolished its aging, 2,600-space Long Term Garage, replacing it with a 1,000 space surface lot for $24M.  This in turn created a parking shortage, and daily lot closings when parking lots would become full. The airport's Twitter account became a daily update of parking closures at the airport. The airport converted the Short Term Garage to a so-called Smart Garage, and valet parking garage. The airport eliminated its free half-hour courtesy parking perk, and began to charge $3 for a half-hour.

See also
 Ohio World War II Army Airfields
 List of tallest air traffic control towers in the United States

References

Sources

External links

 

 

 OPShots.net -CLE Spotters Site
 Master Plan

Airports in Ohio
Airports established in 1925
Transportation buildings and structures in Cleveland
Airfields of the United States Army Air Forces Technical Service Command
Airfields of the United States Army Air Forces in Ohio
Historic Civil Engineering Landmarks
1925 establishments in Ohio
Historic American Engineering Record in Ohio